Microlipophrys canevae is a species of combtooth blenny found in the northeast Atlantic Ocean near Portugal and in the Mediterranean Sea. This species grows to a length of  TL.

A previously undescribed species of combtooth blenny was described from the Adriatic Sea by the French ichthyologist François Charrousset (fr) from two specimens and given the name Lipophrys heuvelmansi. However, in 2015 a comparison of these specimens with specimens of M. canevae showed that L. heuvelsmani  was a junior synonym of this species.

The specific name honours the friend of Vincuguerra's, Giorgio Caneva, whose work encouraged Vinciguerra to study blennies from the Gulf of Genoa and led to the description of this species.

References

Microlipophrys
Fish of the Mediterranean Sea
Taxa named by Decio Vinciguerra
Fish described in 1880